Boris Alekseyevich Dobashin (born April 8, 1966) is a retired Russian professional footballer.

Honours
 Russian Premier League runner-up: 1992.

External links
 

Soviet footballers
Russian footballers
Russian Premier League players
Russian expatriate footballers
Russian expatriate sportspeople in Slovakia
Expatriate footballers in Slovakia
FC Dinamo Sukhumi players
FC Spartak Vladikavkaz players
FK Inter Bratislava players
1966 births
Living people
Association football defenders
FC Dynamo Moscow reserves players
FC FShM Torpedo Moscow players